Arthur "Archie" Styles (29 October 1939 – 9 January 2018) was an English footballer and football manager, who played as a wing half.

Playing career
Styles was signed to the West Bromwich Albion youth team in 1956, turning professional in the same year, however he would only make one league appearance for the Baggies.

In 1960 he would sign for Wrexham, spending one season with the Welsh club.

The remainder of his career would be spent in non-league football, with spells at Hereford United, Kidderminster Harriers and Stourbridge.

Managerial career
Styles would become the manager of Stourbridge in the 1969/70 season, replacing Terry Morrall. During Styles' time in charge he would make it to the quarter finals of the FA Cup.

References

1939 births
2018 deaths
English footballers
Association football midfielders
English Football League players
English football managers
West Bromwich Albion F.C. players
Wrexham A.F.C. players
Hereford United F.C. players
Kidderminster Harriers F.C. players
Stourbridge F.C. players
Sportspeople from Smethwick